Jacqueline Mapei Cummings (born December 20, 1983), is a Swedish-American rapper and singer, best known for her single "Don't Wait", which was released via Downtown Records in 2013. Her debut EP, The Cocoa Butter Diaries, was released in 2009 also via Downtown Records. Her debut album, Hey Hey, was released on September 23, 2014.

History

Early life
Mapei was born in Providence, Rhode Island, but moved before she turned ten years old. She began splitting her time between America and Sweden after her Liberian mother and Swedish stepfather moved to Stockholm, living in Stockholm during the school year and returning to America for the summers. She moved to Brooklyn at age eighteen, working as a bartender in a Swedish restaurant in New York's Chinatown neighborhood. She stayed for three years, taking in the local scene for a period before deciding to return to Sweden and immerse herself in Stockholm's pop scene.

The Cocoa Butter Diaries (2009–2012) 
Mapei released her debut EP as a rapper on Downtown Records in 2009. After the release of The Cocoa Butter Diaries, Mapei began work on her debut album with French electronic duo Justice. However, she was not happy with the final result, and decided to scrap the record. After realizing that she was hitting a wall creatively, she came to the conclusion that she wanted to start singing, telling W: "I was just out there freestyling without writing any songs ... I needed to find some inspiration." She spent the following years traveling, which led to extend stays in Tunisia, Portugal, and Brazil. After a particularly inspiring stint in Brazil, she decided to return to Stockholm and began working with producer Magnus Lidehäll.

"Don't Wait" and Hey Hey (2013–present) 
"Don't Wait" premiered on the website of the magazine The Fader in October 2013. The track went viral immediately, repeatedly reaching #1 on the Hype Machine charts. It received universally positive reviews, with W declaring the song a "devilishly crafted piece of pop perfection" and Vogue praising it for possessing "catchy pop sensibility without falling into the trap of soft-edged lyricism."

The song was remixed by a number of high-profile producers, including a very popular edit by Australian DJ Brynny, and others from Frankie Knuckles, Kingdom, and Giraffage. A version featuring Chance the Rapper was released in March 2014. A remix EP and a video for the original version of "Don't Wait" were released on April 1, 2014. The song debuted on the Billboard Hot Dance Club chart in May 2014 at number 48. The song also charted in UK's and Italy's Airplay Charts at number 173 and 88 respectively.

Mapei's released her second single "Change" on June 10, 2014, followed by "Believe" on August 18. Her debut album Hey Hey was released September 23, 2014 and debuted at #29 on the Heatseeker chart. Mapei performed "Don't Wait" on the Late Show with David Letterman on November 6, 2014. She has cited Radiohead, Donna Summer, Irene Cara, Diana Ross, Missy Elliott, Brandy, Queens of the Stone Age, and Michael Jackson as influences.

Her single "Million Ways to Live" was released in 2015.

In 2019, she released her second album "Sensory Overload", with the Stockholm based record label Amuse. The album contains ten songs and was nominated for a Grammis, which is the Swedish equivalent of a Grammy Award.

Discography

Albums

EPs
2009: The Cocoa Butter Diaries
2014: Don't Wait EP

Singles

As lead artist

As featured artist

Appearances
 "Mary Jane" (2009) – Major Lazer

Music videos

References

1983 births
Living people
21st-century American rappers
21st-century American women singers
American women pop singers
American women rappers
American people of Liberian descent
English-language singers from Sweden
Swedish people of Liberian descent
Swedish women rappers
Swedish pop singers
Downtown Records artists
21st-century American singers
21st-century women rappers